Lusanga (formerly Leverville) is a town in Kwilu province of the Democratic Republic of the Congo. It is at the confluence of the Kwenge and Kwilu rivers.
The town is served by a small airport (IATA Code: LUS).

In the colonial era the town was called Leverville.
It was named after William Lever of the Lever Brothers, which started as a soap-making business and grew into the Unilever consumer goods giant. In 1911 Lever signed a treaty with the Belgian government to gain access to the palm oil of the colony, and established the main coordinating base at Leverville.
The Huileries du Congo Belge (HCB), a subsidiary of Lever Brothers, established a large palm oil factory at Leverville, one of three in Kwilu.

References

Sources

 

Populated places in Kwilu Province
Palm oil production in the Democratic Republic of the Congo